The Spotted Range is a mountain range in Clark County, Nevada.

Spotted Range was so named on account of its spotted rocks.

References 

Mountain ranges of Clark County, Nevada
Mountain ranges of Nevada